Inside My Radio is a rhythm platform game developed by French independent video game developer Seaven Studio and published by Iceberg Interactive. The prototype was made by TurboDindon during Ludum Dare #23, a video game development competition, where it won both the Overall and Audio prizes in the Jam category. Seaven Studio and TurboDindon have continued development in order to release Inside My Radio on Windows, Xbox One and PlayStation 4. On 10 January 2019, the game was released for the Nintendo Switch.

Reception

The game has a score of 68% on Metacritic.

References 

2015 video games
Indie video games
Platform games
PlayStation 4 games
Windows games
Xbox One games
Video games developed in France
Wii U eShop games

Single-player video games